General (Rtd) Tan Sri Dato' Mohd Ghazali bin Mohd Seth (4 February 1929 – 24 August 2021) was the 7th Chief of Defence Forces of Malaysia.

Background
Ghazali was born on 4 February 1929 in Johor Bahru, Johore. He was a prodigy of the state of Johore whom attended secondary school at the legendary and prestigious English College (Maktab Sultan Abu Bakar), Johor Bahru in 1946 and had undergone military training at the Royal Military Academy Sandhurst in 1952. He had served as Army chief (1977–1982) prior to his appointment as the 7th Chief of the Malaysian Defence Forces (1982–1985).

Death
Ghazali died on 24 August 2021 at the Cardiac Vascular Sentral (CVSKL) and was buried at the Bukit Kiara Muslim Cemetery in Kuala Lumpur.

Honours

Honours of Malaysia
  :
 Recipient of the Malaysian Commemorative Medal (Silver) (PPM) (1965)
  Officer of the Order of the Defender of the Realm (KMN) (1968)
  Companion of the Order of the Defender of the Realm (JMN) (1971)
  Commander of the Order of Loyalty to the Crown of Malaysia (PSM) – Tan Sri (1978)
  Commander of the Order of the Defender of the Realm (PMN) – Tan Sri (1981)
 Malaysian Armed Forces :
 Courageous Commander of the Gallant Order of Military Service (PGAT)
  :
  Companion of the Order of the Crown of Johor (SMJ)
  Knight Commander of the Order of the Crown of Johor (DPMJ) – Dato'
  Knight Grand Commander of the Order of the Crown of Johor (SPMJ) – Dato'
  :
  Grand Knight of the Order of the Crown of Pahang (SIMP) – formerly Dato', now Dato' Indera (1981)
  :
  Knight Commander of the Order of Loyalty to Sultan Abdul Halim Mu'adzam Shah (DHMS) – Dato' Paduka (1983)
  :
  Distinguished Service Medal (Gold) (PPC)
  Knight Commander of the Order of the Star of Sarawak (PNBS) – formerly Dato, now Dato Sri
 Knight Commander of the Order of the Star of Hornbill Sarawak (DA) – Datuk Amar (2012)

Foreign Honours
 :
 Honorary Recipient of the Bintang Dharma (BD) (1969)

References

1929 births
2021 deaths
Malaysian Muslims
Malaysian people of Malay descent
People from Johor
Malaysian military personnel
Commanders of the Order of the Defender of the Realm
Commanders of the Order of Loyalty to the Crown of Malaysia
Knights Grand Commander of the Order of the Crown of Johor
Knights Commander of the Order of the Crown of Johor
Companions of the Order of the Crown of Johor
Knights Commander of the Most Exalted Order of the Star of Sarawak
Companions of the Order of the Defender of the Realm
Officers of the Order of the Defender of the Realm
Knights Commander of the Order of the Star of Hornbill Sarawak